This outline is provided as an overview of, and organized list of articles relevant to, the subject of gastropods (snails and slugs):

Gastropod – any member of the class Gastropoda, which includes slugs and snails.

What type of things are gastropods? 

Gastropods can be considered to be, or viewed as, the following:

 Natural resource
 Organisms
 Animals –
Invertebrates
Molluscs
 Seafood

Types of gastropods 
 marine gastropod
 sea snail
 sea slug
 non-marine gastropod
 freshwater gastropod = all are freshwater snails (with very few exceptions)
 freshwater snail
 terrestrial gastropod = terrestrial mollusc
 land snail
 land slug
 semi-slug

Taxonomy
 Taxonomy of the Gastropoda (Ponder & Lindberg, 1997)
 Taxonomy of the Gastropoda (Bouchet & Rocroi, 2005)
 Changes in the taxonomy of gastropods since 2005
 List of gastropods described in the 2000s
 List of gastropods described in 2010
 List of gastropods described in 2011
 List of gastropods described in 2012 - 2012 in molluscan paleontology#Newly named gastropods
 List of gastropods described in 2013 - 2013 in paleomalacology#Gastropods
 List of gastropods described in 2014 - 2014 in molluscan paleontology#Newly named gastropods
 List of gastropods described in 2015 - 2015 in molluscan paleontology#Gastropods
 List of gastropods described in 2016 - 2016 in molluscan paleontology#Gastropods
 List of gastropods described in 2017 - 2017 in paleomalacology#Gastropods

Biology of gastropods
 malacology
 conchology
 malacologist – List of malacologists

Gastropod anatomy

 mollusc shell, seashell
 gastropod shell, conch, conch (instrument)
 protoconch
 apex (mollusc)
 spire (mollusc)
 planispiral
 sculpture (mollusc)
 lira (mollusc)
 varix (mollusc)
 columella (gastropod)
 aperture (mollusc)
 lip (gastropod)
 anal sulcus
 mentum
 parietal callus
 plait (gastropod)
 siphonal canal
 siphonal notch
 stromboid notch
 umbilicus (mollusc)
 callus (mollusc)
 periostracum
 selenizone
 clausilium
 operculum (gastropod)
 epiphragm
 mantle (mollusc) and mantle cavity
 body wall
 propodium
 caudal mucous pit
 nidamental gland
 Parapodium#Gastropod parapodia
 Semper's organ
 suprapedal gland
 snail slime
 sensory organs of gastropods
 caryophyllidia
 Hancock's organ
 osphradium
 rhinophore
 nervous system of gastropods
 euthyneury
 streptoneury
 torsion (gastropod)
 digestive system of gastropods
 proboscis#Gastropods
 radula
 odontophore
 hepatopancreas = digestive gland 
 diverticulum (mollusc)
 style (zoology)
 Respiratory system of gastropods
 ctenidium (mollusc)
 cerata
 cnidosac
 pneumostome
 siphon (mollusc)
 circulatory system of gastropods
 excretory system of gastropods
 pseudofeces
 reproductive system of gastropods
 apophallation
 Love dart
 number of other genital structures: reproductive system of gastropods#Genital structures

Life cycle
 mating of gastropods
 trochophore
 veliger
 estivation
 hibernation

Gastropods according to conservation status
 List of recently extinct molluscs#Gastropods
 List of extinct in the wild animals#Molluscs
 List of critically endangered molluscs#Gastropods
 List of endangered molluscs#Gastropods
 List of vulnerable molluscs#Gastropods
 List of near threatened molluscs#Gastropods
 List of least concern molluscs#Gastropods
 List of data deficient molluscs#Gastropods

Gastropods as a resource
 List of edible molluscs
 heliciculture

 Pest (organism)#Gastropod molluscs

Biogeography of gastropods
 biogeography of gastropods

Lists of marine molluscs by country
 List of marine molluscs of Angola
 List of marine molluscs of Australia
 List of marine molluscs of Brazil
 List of marine molluscs of Chile
 List of marine molluscs of Croatia
 (List of marine molluscs of Ireland)
 List of marine molluscs of Ireland (Gastropoda)
 List of Nudibranchia of Ireland
 List of marine molluscs of Montenegro
 List of marine molluscs of Mozambique
 List of marine molluscs of New Zealand
 List of marine molluscs of Slovenia
 (List of marine molluscs of South Africa)
 List of marine gastropods of South Africa
 List of marine heterobranch gastropods of South Africa
 List of marine molluscs of Sri Lanka
 List of marine molluscs of Venezuela

Lists of non-marine molluscs by country

Terms
 Glossary of gastropod terms

Gastropods
Gastropods